I Can Eat Glass was a linguistic project documented on the early Web by then-Harvard student Ethan Mollick. The objective was to provide speakers with translations of the phrase "I can eat glass, it does not hurt me" from a wide variety of languages; the phrase was chosen because of its unorthodox nature. Mollick's original page disappeared in or about June 2004.

As Mollick explained, visitors to a foreign country have "an irresistible urge" to say something in that language, and whatever they say (a cited example being along the lines of "Where is the bathroom?") usually marks them as tourists immediately. Saying "I can eat glass, it does not hurt me", however, ensures that the speaker "will be viewed as an insane native, and treated with dignity and respect". 

The project grew to considerable size since web surfers were invited to submit translations. The phrase was translated into over 150 languages, including some that are fictional or invented, as well as into code from various computer languages. It became an Internet meme.

References

External links
Web Archive copy of I Can Eat Glass
I Can Eat Glass, Harvard Immediate Gratification Players
I Can Eat Glass in UTF-8, with notes by Frank da Cruz, Columbia University

Internet memes
Translation